The Ice Storm is a 1997 American drama film directed by Ang Lee, based on Rick Moody's 1994 novel of the same name. The film features an ensemble cast of Kevin Kline, Joan Allen, Tobey Maguire, Christina Ricci, Elijah Wood, Katie Holmes, Glenn Fitzgerald, Jamey Sheridan, and Sigourney Weaver. Set during Thanksgiving 1973, The Ice Storm is about two dysfunctional New Canaan, Connecticut, upper-class families who are trying to deal with tumultuous social changes of the early 1970s, and their escapism through alcohol, adultery, and sexual experimentation.

The film opened in the United States on September 27, 1997. Its limited release ultimately grossed US$8 million on a budget of US$18 million. Critical response to the film was positive, and it was selected to compete for the Palme d'Or at the 1997 Cannes Film Festival. Schamus received the Cannes Film Festival Award for Best Screenplay, and Weaver won the BAFTA Award for Best Actress in a Supporting Role.

Plot
In 1973, two families in an affluent Connecticut suburb experiment with adultery and substance abuse over one Thanksgiving weekend. One family, the Hoods, consists of parents Ben and Elena and their children, Paul and Wendy. Ben is dissatisfied with his marriage and his career. 

The other family, Jim and Janey Carver and their sons Mikey and Sandy, are the Hoods’ neighbors and friends. Ben is having an affair with Janey to deal with his midlife dissatisfaction. His wife, Elena, is also bored with her life and looking to bring some excitement back, but is unsure how to do so. Young Wendy Hood enjoys sexual games with the Carver boys and with her school peers. Paul Hood has fallen for Libbets Casey, a classmate at the boarding school he attends, though his roommate Francis is also interested in her. Mikey Carver is thought of as odd and withdrawn by Ben, while the younger Sandy experiments with dangerous objects like toy explosives. 

When Janey does not show for a tryst one day, Ben accuses her of losing interest in the affair. Janey reasons she can’t put the tasks and errands of her own family on hold for him. On the Friday night after Thanksgiving, the Hoods have an argument when Elena realizes her husband is having an affair with Janey. Despite the tension between them, the couple go ahead with plans to attend a neighborhood party. Jim and Janey Carver also attend. It turns out to be a "key party", in which married couples "swap" sexual partners by means of each woman selecting a set of keys from a bowl contributed by each man.

Ben drinks increasingly as the party progresses. When Janey chooses the keys of a younger man, a drunken Ben becomes agitated and trips on the floor. After being helped up, he retreats to the bathroom to sober up, remaining there for the rest of the evening. Meanwhile, a winter storm begins to descend upon the neighborhood.

The other key party participants pair off and leave, until only Jim and Elena remain. She retrieves Jim's keys from the bowl and returns them to him. After debating the issue, Jim and Elena leave together, engaging in a quick, clumsy sexual encounter in the front seat of Jim's car. Jim, regretting the line they just crossed, offers to drive Elena home.

Wendy makes her way to the Carvers' to see Mikey, but he has ventured out into the ice storm. She finds Sandy, who has a crush on her, alone at home. She asks Sandy to climb into bed with her and they remove their clothing. They drink from a bottle of vodka, and after Sandy proclaims his love for Wendy, they fall asleep together.

Paul is invited to Libbets' Manhattan apartment, but upon arriving, is disappointed to learn that Francis was also invited. Through the night the trio drink beer and listen to music. Francis and Libbets also take prescription pills found in Libbets' mother's medicine cabinet. Paul confesses his feelings for Libbets, and in her stupor she tells Paul she thinks of him as a brother. Paul leaves Libbets and Francis passed out in the apartment and just narrowly makes the train back to New Canaan.

Meanwhile, Mikey, out walking in the storm, is enchanted by the beauty of the trees and fields covered in ice. He slides down an icy hill and sits on a guardrail. A moment later, a falling tree takes down a power line, which connects with the guardrail, electrocuting him.

Jim and Elena also get stuck due to fallen trees and return to the Carvers' house as dawn breaks. Elena walks in on her daughter in bed with Sandy, and tells Wendy to get dressed. Janey has also returned home but is curled up in bed in the fetal position, still wearing her party dress.

A sober Ben is driving back to his house when he discovers Mikey's body on the side of the road. He carries the body to the Carvers' house, and the two families are drawn together in grief. Wendy hugs the shocked and numbed Sandy in an attempt to comfort him. Jim is devastated, while Janey stays asleep, oblivious to the news. Ben, Elena, and Wendy later drive to New Canaan station to pick up Paul, whose train was delayed by the power outage. Once all four are together in the car, Ben breaks down and sobs uncontrollably at the wheel as Elena comforts him. Paul watches emotionlessly.

Cast

 Kevin Kline as Ben Hood
 Joan Allen as Elena Hood
 Christina Ricci as Wendy Hood
 Tobey Maguire as Paul Hood
 Jamey Sheridan as Jim Carver
 Sigourney Weaver as Janey Carver
 Elijah Wood as Mikey Carver
 Adam Hann-Byrd as Sandy Carver
 Henry Czerny as George Clair
 Michael Cumpsty as Philip Edwards
 David Krumholtz as Francis Davenport
 Kate Burton as Dorothy Franklin
 Katie Holmes as Libbets Casey
 Glenn Fitzgerald as Neil Conrad
 Allison Janney as Dot Halford
 Larry Pine as Dave Gorman

Production

Development 
The Ice Storm was first brought to the attention of producer James Schamus by his wife, literary scout Nancy Kricorian, who knew Rick Moody from Columbia University's MFA program. Schamus said, "It's an astonishingly cinematic book... But, because of its truly literary qualities, people may have missed its extraordinary cinematic possibilities." Philosopher Slavoj Žižek has stated that Schamus was also inspired by one of Žižek's books at the time of writing the screenplay, commenting "When James Schamus was writing the scenario, he told me that he was reading a book of mine and that my theoretical book was inspiration."

Schamus brought the book to filmmaker Ang Lee, who was the first and only contender to turn the book into a film, and with whom Schamus and partner Ted Hope had already made four films, including The Wedding Banquet in 1993. Despite the obvious appeal of Moody's comedy of familial errors, Lee stated that what attracted him to the book was its climax: the scene where Ben Hood makes a shocking discovery in the ice, followed by the emotional reunion of the Hood family on the morning after the storm. "The book moved me at those two points", says Lee. "I knew there was a movie there."

To prepare for the film, Lee let the cast members study stacks of magazine cutouts from the early 1970s.

Filming 
Principal photography primarily took place in New Canaan and Westchester, New York, and began in April 1996. The ice storm scenes were filmed using a second-unit team prior to the main shoot. Said Schamus, "Hoping it would be below freezing, we drove up through Connecticut at night with a bunch of hoses and a water truck that we used to wet down streets and trees to get ice. On one of those nights, we actually encountered the only real ice storm to hit that area in 30 years. We got some terrific footage of the real thing. However, it soon turned into a snowstorm, and we couldn't use most of what we filmed. We digitally removed the snow from the ground in a few shots, and about five of those are in the finished film."

Reception

The film's release was limited, and it grossed US$8 million against a production budget of US$18 million.

Film critics Gene Siskel and Roger Ebert gave the film "Two Thumbs Up", with Ebert calling it Lee's best work yet, and Siskel calling it his favorite film of 1997. Rotten Tomatoes gives the film a rating of 86% based on 70 reviews, with an average rating of 7.8/10. The site's consensus reads: "Director Ang Lee revisits the ennui-laden decadence of 1970s suburban America with deft humor and gripping pathos". 

Andrew Johnston, writing in Time Out New York, stated: "The 1970s have long been written off as a goofy embarrassment to our country, quite possibly because the actual details of the decade are too painful to us to remember, no matter how old or young we were at the time. Ang Lee's film of Rick Moody's novel cuts through the kitsch to explore the emotional black hole at the heart of the period, the result being an utterly devastating and truly adult drama of the first order."

Janet Maslin of The New York Times wrote "Beautifully acted as it is, The Ice Storm still elects to keep its characters and their emotions at a distance. They remain as hidden from the viewer as they are from one another, which is an essential part of the film's disturbing power. Lee daringly chooses to keep his story's motivational mysteries unexplained, leaving this richly observed film open to the viewer's assessments." She added Schamus "shows particular empathy for the women" and that the film "elicits mournfully fine performances from actresses coming to terms with the film's shaky era. Ms. Weaver shows both hard glamour and desperation in a brittle, striking role. Ms. Allen, especially poignant and graceful, conveys the sad dignity of a woman who can't help being well behind her changing times. And the talented Ms. Ricci makes Wendy a touchingly real malcontent and a ticking time bomb. This story's legacy rests with her."

In a 2022 retrospective for Little White Lies, Kevin Bui wrote that unlike many films that also dealt with suburban dysfunction, The Ice Storm is unique in that it is "primarily focused on the sadness of its ensemble; their despondency to the prospect of change and the fear of the unknown. But what truly separates it from other movies of its ilk is the way it ends with its family united, rather than being torn further apart."

Awards and nominations 
The film was entered into the 1997 Cannes Film Festival, where James Schamus won the award for Best Screenplay. He was nominated for three other awards: Best Screenplay – Adapted at the 51st British Academy Film Awards, Best Adapted Screenplay at the 50th Writers Guild of America Awards, and Best Screenplay, Adapted at the 2nd Golden Satellite Awards. For her performance, Weaver received a nomination for Best Supporting Actress – Motion Picture at the 55th Golden Globe Awards, and a Satellite Award for Best Supporting Actress – Motion Picture nomination. She won the BAFTA Award for Best Actress in a Supporting Role. The film won the Bodil Award for Best American Film in 1999.

Soundtrack

Most of the professional music featured in the film was independently produced 1970s-type music, as budget values were tight. Lee and Schamus wanted to have an "actual score", not a "nostalgic film with radio music of an earlier time". The soundtrack was released in the United States on October 21, 1997.

Home media
Following the theatrical exhibition of The Ice Storm, the film was made available on home video by 20th Century Fox Home Entertainment on October 13, 1998. A re-issued VHS was released on September 5, 2000. The film made its DVD debut on March 13, 2001, before American distribution company Criterion acquired the rights to release a special 2-disc DVD edition as part of the Criterion Collection on March 18, 2008. Criterion released this version in a Blu-ray format on July 23, 2013.

References

Bibliography

External links
 
 
 
 
 
The Ice Storm: Baby, It’s Cold Outside an essay by Bill Krohn at the Criterion Collection

1997 films
1997 drama films
Adultery in films
American drama films
BAFTA winners (films)
Best Foreign Film Guldbagge Award winners
Existentialist films
Fox Searchlight Pictures films
Films about dysfunctional families
Films based on American novels
Films directed by Ang Lee
Films produced by James Schamus
Films set in 1973
Films set in Connecticut
Films shot in Connecticut
Films with screenplays by James Schamus
Thanksgiving in films
Films scored by Mychael Danna
1990s English-language films
1990s American films